Brian Freeman may refer to:

 Brian Freeman (psychological suspense author) (born 1963), author of psychological suspense novels
 Brian James Freeman (born 1979), American horror and fiction author from Pennsylvania
 Brian Freeman (actor), founded gay theatre troupe Pomo Afro Homos

See also
 Bryan Freeman (born 1978), American murderer
 Brian Friedman (born 1977), American dancer and choreographer